José Celso Martinez Corrêa, known as Zé Celso (born 30 March 1937), is a Brazilian stage actor, director and playwright. He was one of the founders of Teatro Oficina, an innovative and politically active theater company associated with the 1960s Tropicalismo movement.

Zé Celso became notable in the scene with his adaptation of Oswald de Andrade's play O Rei da Vela (The Candle King), in 1967. He also co-wrote with Chico Buarque the 1968 play Roda Viva, which was targeted as pornographic and censored during the military dictatorship.  One of his most recent plays is Os Sertões, a trilogy adapting the book by Euclides da Cunha.

References

1937 births
Living people
People from Araraquara
Brazilian theatre directors
20th-century Brazilian dramatists and playwrights
Brazilian male dramatists and playwrights
20th-century Brazilian male writers
21st-century Brazilian dramatists and playwrights
21st-century Brazilian male writers